Theodard was also the murdered bishop Theodard of Maastricht.

Saint Theodard (ca. 840–1 May, ca. 893) was an archbishop of Narbonne.  He may have been born to the nobility and served as a subdeacon at a church council at Toulouse.

He was appointed archdeacon by Archbishop Sigebod of Narbonne (873-855).  After Sigebod's death in 885, Theodard succeeded him and was consecrated on 15 August 885.  In 886 he went to Rome to obtain the pallium, the symbol of his office, from Stephen VI.

During his episcopate, Theodard protected the rights of his diocese, repaired the damages caused by Moorish incursions, restored the cathedral of Narbonne, and worked to release captive Christians.

He was buried at the Benedictine Montauriol Abbey, initially dedicated to Saint Martin, which was later renamed after Theodard.

Veneration
His relics are said to have been plundered by the Huguenots and except for a small remnant have since disappeared.

External links
Theodard at the Catholic Encyclopedia

840s births
893 deaths
Saints of West Francia
French Roman Catholic saints
9th-century French bishops
Archbishops of Narbonne
9th-century Christian saints